Alberto Agra (born April 7, 1963) is a Filipino lawyer who previously served as acting Justice secretary of the Republic of the Philippines.

He also serves as president of Pilipinas Obstacle Sports Federation.

Career
Agra was appointed by President Gloria Macapagal Arroyo as acting solicitor general and acting justice secretary in 2010. Three years later, the Supreme Court declared his dual appointment as unconstitutional.

During his tenure as justice secretary, he dropped charges against two suspects in the Ampatuan massacre case, ARMM governor Zaldy Ampatuan and his brother Akmad Ampatuan.

His department also failed to protect Suwaib Upham, a key witness and self-confessed participant in the massacre who sought witness protection and was later murdered in Maguindanao.

Two days before the end of his term, he dismissed charges against government personnel accused of human trafficking.

On 2016, he was appointed by President Rodrigo Duterte as chairman of the board of Philippine Reclamation Authority.

References

Living people
20th-century Filipino lawyers
Secretaries of Justice of the Philippines
Solicitors General of the Philippines
Arroyo administration cabinet members
1963 births